The 1997 Liga Perdana season is the fourth and final season of the top-tier league, Liga Perdana (1994–97). A total of 15 teams participated in the season with 14 teams from Malaysia and one foreign team, Brunei.

The season kicked off on 5 April 1997. Sarawak dominated the season and ended up winning the title.

Teams

15 teams competing in the last season of Liga Perdana before it was succeeded by the formation of Liga Perdana 1.

 Sarawak (1997 Liga Perdana champions)
 Kedah
 Sabah
 Selangor
 Perlis
 Negeri Sembilan
 Perak
 Kuala Lumpur
 Pahang
 Pulau Pinang
 Kelantan
 Terengganu
 Johor
 Malacca
 Brunei

League Table:-

1.Sarawak  - 54 PTS (1997 Liga Perdana Champions)

2.Kedah  - 50 PTS

3.Sabah  - 49 PTS

4.Selangor  - 46 PTS

5.Brunei  - 45 PTS

6.Perlis  - 45 PTS

7.Negeri Sembilan  - 44 PTS

8.Perak  - 41 PTS

9.Kuala Lumpur  - 38 PTS

10.Pahang  - 37 PTS

11.Pulau Pinang  - 33 PTS

12.Johor  - 32 PTS  (Relegated to 1998 Liga Perdana 2)

13.Kelantan  - 28 PTS  (Relegated to 1998 Liga Perdana 2)

14.Malacca  - 24 PTS  (Relegated to 1998 Liga Perdana 2)

15.Terengganu  - 22 PTS  (Relegated to 1998 Liga Perdana 2)

Champions

References

Liga Perdana (1994–1997) seasons
1
Malaysia